The Latin Quarter of Paris is an area in the 5th and the 6th arrondissements of Paris. It is situated on the left bank of the Seine, around the Sorbonne.

Known for its student life, lively atmosphere, and bistros, the Latin Quarter is the home to a number of higher education establishments besides the university itself, such as :

 Paris City University (with the Faculté de Médecine de Paris) ; 
 Sorbonne University (with Sorbonne and Jussieu university campus) 
 PSL University (with the École Normale Supérieure - PSL and the École des Mines de Paris - PSL campuses) ;
 the lycée Henri-IV, the lycée Louis-le-Grand and the lycée Saint-Louis, known as les trois lycées de la montagne
 Panthéon-Assas University ;
 Panthéon-Sorbonne University (with the École de droit de la Sorbonne) ;
 the Collège de France ;
 and the Schola Cantorum.

Other establishments such as the École Polytechnique have relocated in recent times to more spacious settings.

The area gets its name from the Latin language, which was widely spoken in and around the University during the Middle Ages, after the twelfth century philosopher Pierre Abélard and his students took up residence there.

See also
 Montagne Sainte-Geneviève
 List of restaurant districts and streets
University of Paris
 PSL Research University
 Sorbonne University

References

Further reading
 André Arnold-Peltier, Vassili Karist,  Le Quartier Latin et ses entours / and its surroundings, Éditions PIPPA, collection Itinérances
 André Arnold-Peltier, Vassili Karist,  Le jardin du Luxembourg / The Luxembourg gardens, Éditions PIPPA, collection Itinérances
 Sophie Peltier-Le Dinh, Danielle Michel-Chich, André Arnold-Peltier,  Le Lycée Henri-IV, entre potaches et moines copistes, Éditions PIPPA, collection Itinérances

External links
  quartierlatin.paris - online Review about cultural activities in Quartier Latin (bookshops, publishers, gallery, cinema, theaters, etc.)
  The Quartier Latin - In depth exploration of literary culture, wine bars and Oscar Wilde
  The Quartier Latin - current photographs and of the years 1900
 Paris CVB-Latin Quarter
 The Latin Quarter - More information and historical context from travel writers focused on France.

5th arrondissement of Paris
6th arrondissement of Paris
Districts of Paris
 
Restaurant districts and streets in France
Student quarters
Urban quarters in France
Tourist attractions in Paris